Aleksandar Popov (born 15 August 1996) is a former Bulgarian footballer who played as a midfielder. His last club was Chernomorets Balchik.

Career
On 23 March 2013, Popov was called up to the Cherno More first team for a friendly match against Svetkavitsa in which he played for a few minutes. In January 2014, he was included in Cherno More's 25-man squad for their training camp in Turkey. Aleksandar made his first team début in a 0-1 away defeat against Pirin Gotse Delchev on 21 February 2014, coming on as substitute for Daniel Georgiev. Popov retired from football in January 2019.

Career statistics

References

External links

1996 births
Living people
Sportspeople from Varna, Bulgaria
Bulgarian footballers
Association football midfielders
PFC Cherno More Varna players
PFC Kaliakra Kavarna players
PFC Dobrudzha Dobrich players
FC Chernomorets Balchik players
FC Lokomotiv Gorna Oryahovitsa players
First Professional Football League (Bulgaria) players
Second Professional Football League (Bulgaria) players